The Proggy programming fonts are a set of free fixed-width typefaces designed with programming and terminal work in mind.

Fonts
The project started with the four Proggy typefaces authored by Tristan Grimmer: Proggy Clean, Square, Small, and Tiny, circa 2004. Other contributors had their fonts added to the collection with time, which account to about 10 additional typefaces.

It is currently a member of the Gentoo Linux packaging system.

The typefaces are usually provided as single-size 9 point raster fonts. They are offered in a variety of formats in order to be usable on different platforms, including Windows, Mac OS X, Unix and Unix-like systems.

Reception
Craig Buckler at SitePoint listed it as one of the top programming fonts. It was mentioned by Jeff Atwood. The Proggy collection became very popular among programmers and system administrators.

References

External links

www.proggyfonts.net Original content mirrored at new domain. Some fonts missing at time of launch.

Monospaced typefaces
Computer programming
Typefaces and fonts introduced in 2004
Raster typefaces